St Ladoca's Church, Ladock, is a Grade I listed parish church in the Church of England Diocese of Truro in Ladock, Cornwall, England, UK.

History

The parish church of St Ladoca has a fine west tower built of granite blocks. The north side of the church is 13th-century in date while the south aisle is 15th-century and the chancel was much altered by George Street in 1862–64. The contractor was Messrs Bone of Liskeard and the restoration cost £2,000. Most of the walls were rebuilt. The gallery was taken down, and the church was partly re-roofed. The mullions and dressings of the windows were in Ham Hill stone. New seating was provided of stained deal, with carved ends, and the sittings were covered with scarlet pile carpeting. The pulpit was new, of open stone woodwork, consisting of pitch pine with ebony shafts, and stone base by Clarke of Bath. A new low oak screen divided the nave from the chancel. The chancel was improved with an east window of stained glass by Morris and Faulkner of London, representing the different Marys mentioned in the New Testament, the centre light representing Mary, the sister of Lazarus, at the house of Simon the leper. The flooring of the aisles was laid with squares of Portland stone, diagonally placed with black and red tiles. The chancel was laid with encaustic tiles of different colours, alternating with Portland stone. The reredos was made with dark encaustic tiles on the two sides with carved alabaster in the centre, and a super altar of polished serpentine, with a painted front by Edward Arthur Fellowes Prynne. In the centre of the reredos, a large cross of Irish marble was inlaid.

Interesting features include the carved base of the rood screen and the font of Catacleuse stone. The feast traditionally celebrated in the parish is held on the Sunday after the first Thursday in January.

Parish status

The church is in a joint parish with

St Crida's Church, Creed
St Nun's Church, Grampound
St Probus and St Grace's Church, Probus
St Hermes' Church, St Erme

Bells

A new peal of six bells was installed in 1883 by Taylors of Loughborough. They replaced the three old bells which were dated 1870, 1743, and one from the time of King Charles II. The new bells were in the key of G, with the tenor weighing about 12 cwt.

Organ

The church contains an organ by Henry Willis. A specification of the organ can be found on the National Pipe Organ Register.

References

Ladock
Ladock